Rihairo Meulens (born 3 June 1988) is a Curaçaoan footballer who plays for ASV Dronten in the lower-tier Tweede Klasse.

Career

Club
Meulens is a striker who was born in Apeldoorn and made his debut in professional football, being part of the Vitesse Arnhem squad in the 2006–07 season. He spent the 2007–08 season on loan with AGOVV.

At the beginning of the 2011-12 season he was on trial at De Graafschap, but eventually joined the Eerste Divisie side Almere City FC on 11 July 2011.

In July 2015, Meulens signed a two-year contract with Azerbaijan Premier League side Zira FK. On 5 January 2016, Meulens cancelled his contract with Zira by mutual consent.

After leaving Zira, Meulens went on trial with Kazakhstan Premier League side Irtysh Pavlodar, scoring in their 3-2 victory over Dila Gori on 3 February 2016.

At the beginning of July 2016, Meulens went on trial at Eerste Divisie side FC Volendam, signing a one-year contract with the club on 2 August 2016.

International
Meulens made his international debut on 7 September 2011 in a 2014 FIFA World Cup qualifying match against Haiti. He scored his first international goal during the qualification process, in a 5–2 loss against Antigua and Barbuda.

Career statistics

Club

International

Statistics accurate as of match played 4 September 2015

International goals

References

1988 births
Living people
Dutch footballers
Dutch people of Curaçao descent
Curaçao footballers
Curaçao international footballers
Eredivisie players
Eerste Divisie players
Liga I players
Azerbaijan Premier League players
SBV Vitesse players
AGOVV Apeldoorn players
Roda JC Kerkrade players
Almere City FC players
FC Dordrecht players
FC Rapid București players
Zira FK players
FC Volendam players
Sportspeople from Apeldoorn
2014 Caribbean Cup players
Curaçao expatriate footballers
Dutch expatriate footballers
Curaçaon expatriates in Romania
Dutch expatriate sportspeople in Romania
Expatriate footballers in Romania
Dutch expatriate sportspeople in Azerbaijan
Expatriate footballers in Azerbaijan
Association football midfielders
VVOG players
Footballers from Gelderland